The 42nd Golden Horse Awards (Mandarin:第42屆金馬獎) took place on November 13, 2005 at Keelung Cultural Center in Keelung, Taiwan.

References

42nd
2005 film awards
2005 in Taiwan